Șolcani is a commune in Soroca District, Moldova. It is composed of two villages, Cureșnița Nouă and Șolcani.

References

Communes of Soroca District